Nystaleinae is a subfamily of the moth family Notodontidae. The subfamily was described by William Trowbridge Merrifield Forbes in 1948.

Diversity
The subfamily Nystaleinae contains approximately 300 species.

Distribution
The subfamily is restricted almost entirely to the Neotropics, with a few species extending as far north as Canada.

Genera

References

 ;  2010: Annotated check list of the Noctuoidea (Insecta, Lepidoptera) of North America north of Mexico. ZooKeys, 40: 1-239. 
 , 2011: A new species of Elasmia Möschler from New Mexico and Texas, and a new subspecies of Elasmia mandela (Druce) from Texas and Oklahoma (Lepidoptera, Notodontidae, Nystaleinae). ZooKeys 149: 51-67.
 
 , 2013: World Catalogue of Insects: Notodontidae & Oenosandridae (Lepidoptera), Volume 11: 1-608.
 , 1993: Groupe d'espèces proches de Phedosia turbida Möschler 1878 (Lepidoptera Notodontidae). Lambillionea 93 (4): 407-410.
 , 2009: Schausiplusia lahoussei n. sp. (Lepidoptera: Notodontidae). Nouvelle Revue d'Entomologie 25 (4): 373-376.
 , 2010: Notes a propos de la description de nouvelles especes de Nystaleini de l´Amerique Tropicale (Lepidoptera, Notodontidae). Lambillionea 110 (1): 101-117.
  1992: Survey of adult morphology in Nystaleinae and related Neotropical subfamilies (Noctuoidea: Notodontidae). Journal of research on the Lepidoptera, 31(3-4): 233-277. 

Notodontidae